Virginia's 5th Senate district is one of 40 districts in the Senate of Virginia. It has been represented by Democrat Lionell Spruill since his victory in a 2016 special election to succeed fellow Democrat Kenny Alexander, who was elected mayor of Norfolk.

Geography
District 5 is located in the Hampton Roads metropolitan area in southeastern Virginia, including parts of Norfolk and Chesapeake.

The district overlaps with Virginia's 3rd and 4th congressional districts, and with the 77th, 78th, 79th, 81st, 89th, and 90th districts of the Virginia House of Delegates.

Recent election results

2019

2016 special

2015

2012 special

2011

Federal and statewide results in District 5

Historical results
All election results below took place prior to 2011 redistricting, and thus were under different district lines.

2007

2003

1999

1995

District officeholders since 1940

References

Virginia Senate districts
Chesapeake, Virginia
Norfolk, Virginia